Sir William Rose Robinson  (28 June 182227 April 1886) was a British civil servant of the Indian civil service who acted as the Governor of Madras from 28 April 1875 to 23 November 1875.

Early life and education 

William Rose Robinson was born in 1822 to William Rose Robinson. He had his education at Bonn and Haileybury graduating in 1840-41.

Career 

Robinson joined the Indian civil service in 1842 and went to India. He became the Inspector General of Police (Madras Presidency) in 1865 and served in the capacity from 1865 to 1870. He served as the revenue member of the Executive council of the Governor of Madras from 1870 to 1873 and as additional member in the executive council of the Viceroy of India from 1873 to 1878. Robinson acted as the Governor of Madras from 28 April 1875 to 23 November 1875.

Death 

Robinson died on 27 April 1886.

Honours 

Robinson was made a Companion of the Order of the Star of India in 1866 and promoted to a Knight Commander in 1876.

References 

 

1822 births
1886 deaths
Governors of Madras
Knights Commander of the Order of the Star of India